EDSA station is a railway station located on the South Main Line in Makati, Metro Manila, Philippines. It derives its name from nearby Epifanio de los Santos Avenue (EDSA, the avenue which it is named after).

EDSA is the eleventh station from Tutuban and is one of three stations serving Makati, the other two being Buendia and Pasay Road, and is the last station to be physically located in Makati before entering Taguig.

The station was rebuilt in 2005 by the Makati City Government as part of the overall redevelopment and beautification of the Magallanes Interchange Park which sits below the interchange. As a result, unlike other stations, EDSA station was not included in the 2009 remodeling of stations as part of PNR's rehabilitation efforts.  A product of the prior rehabilitation is the station's lower platforms, which are designed only to accommodate older long-distance trains.  For the convenience of passengers, the station has staircases to facilitate the boarding and alighting of passengers on PNR diesel multiple unit trains.

Since September 10, 2018, PNR extended the Caloocan Shuttle Line from Dela Rosa to FTI as its new terminus, thus EDSA station is included in the newly extended line.

Nearby landmarks
The station's major landmarks are the Alphaland Southgate Tower and Mall, San Lorenzo Place and Mall, and Savemore Market on Chino Roces Avenue. Further away from the station are Bangkal, Paseo de Magallanes, Magallanes Village, Dasmariñas Village, San Lorenzo Village, and Ecology Village.

Transportation links
EDSA station is accessible by jeepneys plying the Chino Roces Avenue and South Luzon Expressway routes, as well as buses plying the South Luzon Expressway route. Unusually for a PNR station, a taxi stand is located outside the station's entrance.

An MRT-3 station, Magallanes, is a short walk from EDSA station.

Station Layout

References

Philippine National Railways stations
Railway stations in Metro Manila
Railway stations opened in 2005
Buildings and structures in Makati